Ahasverus is a genus of beetles in the family Silvanidae.

Species include:

 Ahasverus advena Waltl
 Ahasverus cryptophagoides Reitter
 Ahasverus delauneyi Grouvelle
 Ahasverus excisus Reitter
 Ahasverus humeralis Grouvelle
 Ahasverus longulus Blatchley
 Ahasverus nausibioides Grouvelle
 Ahasverus plagiatus Grouvelle
 Ahasverus rectus LeConte
 Ahasverus subopacus Grouvelle

References

Silvanidae genera